The 571st Strategic Missile Squadron is an inactive United States Air Force unit.  It was last assigned to the 390th Strategic Missile Wing at Davis-Monthan Air Force Base, Arizona.  It was equipped with the LGM-25C Titan II intercontinental ballistic missile, with a mission of nuclear deterrence.  The squadron was inactivated as part of the phaseout of the Titan II on 3 December 1983.

The squadron was first activated during World War II as the 571st Bombardment Squadron.  After training in the United States, it deployed to the European Theater of Operations, where it participated in the strategic bombing campaign against Germany.  It was twice awarded the Distinguished Unit Citation for its actions in combat.  After V-E Day, the squadron returned to the United States, where it was inactivated in August 1945.

History

World War II

Activation and training in the United States
The squadron was first activated at Geiger Field, Washington in January 1943 as the 571st Bombardment Squadron, one of the four original squadrons of the 390th Bombardment Group. A cadre from the squadron and group went to the Army Air Force School of Applied Tactics at Orlando Army Air Base, Florida for advanced training. The 390th Group was the first to go through this training process, which was followed by later combat groups. The squadron was filled out with Boeing B-17 Flying Fortress heavy bombers beginning the following month and trained at Geiger and at Great Falls Army Air Base, Montana until early July 1943. The squadron's air echelon ferried their B-17s to England via the north Atlantic ferry route, with the first bombers arriving on 13 July.

Combat in the European Theater

The squadron arrived at its combat station, RAF Framlingham in July 1943 and flew its first combat mission on 12 August against targets in the Ruhr.  Five days later, the squadron attacked the Messerschmitt factory at Regensburg, for which it earned its first Distinguished Unit Citation (DUC).  The Regensburg mission was a "shuttle" mission, and the squadron continued after striking the target to recover at Twelfth Air Force bases in North Africa.  Poor weather at the departure bases extended the time required to assemble the strike force, making fuel reserves critical.  Half of the fighter cover missed the rendezvous, lessening the bombers' protection.  For an hour and a half after its entry into German airspace, the strike force bore attacks from German interceptors.  The 390th Group suffered the heaviest losses of the leading wing, but had the best bombing results, which destroyed equipment used for the assembly of the Me 262 jet fighter, delaying its introduction into service.

On 14 October 1943, the squadron carried out an attack on the ball bearing factories at Schweinfurt, braving unrelenting attacks by enemy fighters, despite which, the 390th Group had the highest accuracy of the attacking force.  For this mission it received a second DUC.  In late February 1944, the squadron participated in Big Week, the concentrated assault on Germany's aircraft manufacturing industry, including plants manufacturing aircraft instruments and depots for aviation supplies.  Other strategic targets included attacks on navy bases at Bremen, bridges at Cologne, marshalling yards at Frankfurt am Main, factories at Mannheim, synthetic oil plants at Merseburg, and oil refineries at Zeitz.

The squadron was occasionally diverted from the strategic bombing campaign to fly air support and interdiction missions.  It bombed near Caen fifteen minutes before the first landings on the Normandy coast on D Day.  It provided support during Operation Cobra, the breakout at Saint Lo in late July 1944.  During the Battle of the Bulge from December 1944 through January 1945, it cut German supply lines to the battle area.  It attacked Axis air bases to support Operation Varsity, the airborne assault across the Rhine, in March 1945.  The squadron flew its last combat mission on 20 April 1945.

Return to the United States and inactivation
Just prior to and after V-E Day, the squadron dropped food supplies to civilians in the Netherlands. The squadron reassembled at Sioux Falls Army Air Field, South Dakota later that month and was inactivated there on 28 August 1945.

Intercontinental ballistic missiles
The squadron was redesignated the 571st Strategic Missile Squadron and organized at Davis-Monthan Air Force Base, Arizona on 1 May 1962 as a Strategic Air Command (SAC) LGM-25C Titan II intercontinental ballistic missile squadron.   The squadron was mostly formed from ground up and was initially concerned with training and duties associated with facility construction, for the first Titan did not arrive until November, and the squadron's first missile silo (571-9) went on operational alert in 1963.  When the full squadron went on alert in November 1963, the 390th Wing became the first Titan II wing to go on alert.

The Titan II was an improvement over the Titan I.  It used storeable liquid propellant and all inertial guidance.  It could be launched from its silo and carried a larger warhead.  The squadron operated nine missile sites:

 571-1 (18 Jul 1963 – 2 Aug 1983), 6.4 mi E of Benson, AZ 
 571-2 (17 Sep 1963 – 21 Nov 1983), 4.7 mi W of Benson, AZ 
 571-3 (10 Oct 1963 – 4 Oct 1983), 4.6 mi ESE of Pantano, AZ   
 571-4 (24 Oct 1963 – 10 Aug 1983), 5.7 mi WSW of Pantano, AZ  
 571-5 (24 Jul 1963 – 3 Mar 1983), 8.4 mi SE of Continental, AZ   
 571-6 (2 Jul 1963 – 29 Sep 1982), 5.4 mi S of Amado, AZ          
 571-7 (15 Jul 1963 – 12 Nov 1982), 3.8 mi NNW of Continental, AZ  
 571-8 (15 Apr 1963 – 8 Feb 1984), 10.3 mi W of Keystone Peak, AZ 
 571-9 (6 Apr 1963 – 4 Jan 1984), 5.6 mi WSW of Three Points, AZ 

In November 1964, the squadron and the 390th Wing became the first Titan II unit in SAC to complete an operational readiness inspection.

On 2 October 1981, Deputy Secretary of Defense Frank Carlucci directed the inactivation of the Titan II as soon as possible.  Project Rivet Cap, the termination of the Titan II weapons system, formally began with the removal of site 571-6 from alert on 30 September 1982.  In November 1983, explosive demolition of Titan II silos at Davis-Monthan began.  The squadron was inactivated on 2 December 1983.  Complexes that were still active were transferred to the 570th Strategic Missile Squadron, and the last former squadron site (571-8) was inactivated on 8 February 1984.

Local aviation enthusiasts associated with the Pima Air Museum won Defense Department approval in 1984 to set aside one silo for permanent display. The silo at Green Valley (571-7) was retained by the Air Force and leased to local government for use as the "Titan Missile Museum." With a training Titan II missile in place, the silo is maintained by a dedicated organization of volunteers from nearby retirement communities. The site was placed on the National Register of Historic Places as the only surviving sample of a Titan II installation. In addition to the launch complex and missile, the museum obtained auxiliary support equipment for display.

Lineage
 Constituted as the 571st Bombardment Squadron (Heavy) on 15 January 1943
 Activated on 26 January 1943
 Redesignated 571st Bombardment Squadron, Heavy c. 20 August 1943
 Inactivated on 28 August 1945
 Redesignated 571st Strategic Missile Squadron and activated on 28 November 1961 (not organized)
 Organized on 1 May 1962
 Inactivated on 2 December 1983

Assignments
 390th Bombardment Group, 26 January 1943 – 28 August 1945
 Strategic Air Command, 28 November 1961 (not organized)
 390th Strategic Missile Wing, 1 May 1962 – 3 December 1983

Stations
 Geiger Field, Washington, 26 January 1943
 Great Falls Army Air Base, Montana, 6 June – 4 July 1943
 RAF Framlingham (AAF-153), England, 26 July 1943 – 6 August 1945
 Sioux Falls Army Air Field, South Dakota, 14–28 August 1945
 Davis-Monthan Air Force Base, Arizona, 1 May 1962 – 3 December 1983

Aircraft and missiles
 Boeing B-17 Flying Fortress, 1943–1945
 LGM-25C Titan II, 1965–1983

Awards and campaigns

See also

 List of United States Air Force missile squadrons
 B-17 Flying Fortress units of the United States Army Air Forces

References

Notes

Bibliography

 
 
 
 
 
 
 

571
Military units and formations disestablished in 1983